A horseshoe curve is a class of climbing curve in a roadbed which reverses turn direction (inflection) twice on either side of a single tight curve that varies through an angle of about 180 degrees or more.

Such curves are more commonly found in a railway line but are also used in roads.  The characteristic U shape, or even slight balloon shape, of such a curve resembles a horseshoe. On roadways, particularly tight versions of such curves are typically called hairpin turns.

Theory 
A horseshoe curve is a means to lengthen an ascending or descending grade and thereby reduce the maximum gradient. Grade or gradient is defined as the rise divided by the run (length) or distance, so in principle such curves add to length for the same altitude gain, just as would a climbing spiral around one or more peaks, or a climbing traverse (cutting) wrapping around an end of a ridge.

If the straight route between two points is too steep to climb, a more circuitous route will increase the distance traveled, allowing the difference in altitude to be averaged over a longer track (or road) length. Unlike a spiral, a horseshoe curve does not involve the track crossing over itself, and the full horseshoe involves both relatively straight sections, curve deflections in both directions and tightly curved segment; while a spiral generally has a more uniform curvature. Obviously, a horseshoe also gives rise to a severe change in direction requiring another corrective curve to regain displacement in the overall direction of travel, while a spiral generally does not.

A horseshoe curve is sometimes used where the route bridges a deep gully. Deviating from a straight-line route along the edge of the gully may allow it to be crossed at a better location.

Horseshoe curves are common on railway lines in steeply graded or hilly country, where means must be found to achieve acceptable grades and minimize construction costs. As with spirals, the main limitation in laying out a horseshoe is keeping its radius as large as possible, as sharp curves limit train speed, and through increased friction, are harder on rails, requiring more frequent replacement of outer tracks.

Examples

Europe

Germany
 The Rhein-Ruhr S-Bahn in Germany has a horseshoe curve in Neviges, Velbert on the route between Essen and Wuppertal, known as the Prince William railway.

Norway

 The Dovre Line, the main line of the Norwegian railway network, has a horseshoe within Grønbogen tunnel from Dombås at the steep hills to the Dovre plateau, standard gauge, single track.
 The Flåm Line, Norway, has a double horseshoe, one inside a tunnel, one in the open, few kilometres below top station, standard gauge, single track.
 The Rauma Line, Norway, has a double horseshoe through the steep and narrow valley at Verma, one inside a tunnel and one that includes the Kylling Bridge, standard gauge, single track.

Poland
 Grybów, Poland has a horseshoe curve 2,5 km west of the town.
 Kalisz, Poland has a double horseshoe curve leading the tracks from a flat plateau down to the valley of the Prosna river.
 Between Jelenia Góra and Szklarska Poręba in Poland there is a five-times, elongated horseshoe curve (50°51′19"N, 15°34′17"E). "N+15°33'23.6"E/@50.848201,15.5543693 Map

Slovakia
In Slovakia there is a significant number of horseshoe curves on the Banská Bystrica to Turčianske Teplice railway track and on the railway from Zvolen to Turčianske Teplice. More than 20 tunnels and couple of horseshoe curves were built to overcome rough terrain and elevation differences.

United Kingdom
 Newcastle Quayside branch, a goods-only railway from the main line to the river quayside, through a steeply descending horseshoe tunnel.
The horseshoe curve on the West Highland Line in Scotland between Upper Tyndrum and Bridge of Orchy was built because the engineers of the railway couldn't afford to build a viaduct crossing the remote valley.

North America

United States
Pennsylvania
 The four-track route built by the Pennsylvania Railroad (PRR), the Horseshoe Curve that starts its climb along Kittanning Run due west of Altoona, and crosses two runs and three mountain faces using three gaps of the Allegheny.
 Muleshoe Curve, near Duncansville; Pennsylvania Railroad.
 "Mance Curve," between Meyersdale and Hyndman, Pennsylvania, along Sand Patch Grade (part of CSX Transportation's Keystone Subdivision) used by freight trains and Amtrak's Capitol Limited (Chicago-Washington, D.C.)
 Coles Curve; Coles, Pennsylvania; East Broad Top Railroad;  gauge (out of service)
Alaska
 In the Loop District of the Alaska Railroad between mileposts 48 and 51 northeast of Seward, Alaska, there was a horseshoe and a spiral, both on an extensive range of timber trestles up to 106 feet high. Track relocation in 1951 removed the original horseshoe, the spiral and all the trestles but added a new horseshoe at milepost 48.
California
 Stanford Curve; Truckee, California; Union Pacific Railroad (originally Central Pacific Railroad, and then Southern Pacific Railroad).
 Five curves on the California Western Railroad climbing the coast range east of Fort Bragg, California
 The Cantara Loops between Dunsmuir, California, and Mount Shasta, California. "N+122°16'53.7"W/@41.2603058,-122.2860363 Map
 Chorro, California on the grade from San Luis Obispo to Cuesta Pass, a route owned by the Union Pacific Railroad and used by Amtrak's Coast Starlight (Los Angeles to Seattle).
Colorado
 Big Ten Curve; at the foot of the Front Range west of Arvada; Union Pacific (originally D&SL).
 Fir Loop; near the summit of La Veta Pass; San Luis and Rio Grande Railroad (originally D&RG).
Horseshoe curves were used extensively on the many narrow gauge railroads in the Colorado Rocky Mountains, now mostly abandoned, for example:
 On the Cumbres and Toltec Scenic Railroad (formerly D&RGW);  gauge:
Coxo Curve; Cumbres, Colorado
Tanglefoot Curve; Cumbres, Colorado
Los Pinos Curve; Los Pinos, Colorado
Phantom Curve; Sublette, New Mexico
Whiplash Curve; Big Horn, Colorado
Lava Loop; Lava, Colorado
 Ophir Loop; Ophir, Colorado; Rio Grande Southern Railroad –  gauge (abandoned)
 Altura Curve; Altura, Colorado; Rio Grande, Pagosa and Northern;  gauge (abandoned)
On the Uintah Railway;  gauge (abandoned):
66° curve; Moro Castle, Colorado;
Balloon Loop; Columbine, Colorado
Hairpin Curve and Muleshoe Curve; McAndrews, Colorado
Idaho
 Horseshoe Tunnel, south of Culdesac, Idaho on the Camas Prairie Railroad.
Maryland
 Helmstetter's Curve; Corriganville, Maryland, between Cumberland and Frostburg, Maryland, at Cash Valley Road; former Western Maryland Railway Connellsville Extension, now the Western Maryland Scenic Railroad.
Montana
 Vendome Loop; 9 miles west of Whitehall on the eastern approach to Pipestone Pass; Milwaukee Road (abandoned 1980).
Nevada
 Arnold Loop; on the eastern approach to Silver Zone Pass in the Toano Range in eastern Nevada; Union Pacific (formerly Western Pacific).
New York
 Swain, New York; Pittsburg, Shawmut, & Northern Railroad (abandoned)
 Richburg, New York; Pittsburg, Shawmut, & Northern Railroad (abandoned)
Oregon
 East of Oakridge on the Cascade Line.
Utah
 Gilluly Loops, a double horeshoe west of Soldier Summit, Utah; Union Pacific (formerly D&RGW).
Washington
 Foss Creek, between Skykomish and the Cascade Tunnel.

Canada
British Columbia
 Notch Hill, on CP's Shuswap Sub near Salmon Arm, British Columbia.

Asia

China
Jiangsu
 In the urban area of Nanjing, China, a horseshoe connects the railway between the Zhonghuamen and Xuanwu Lake, which belongs to the Nanjing-Wuhu Railway.

Shaanxi
 Baoji-Chengdu Railway
 Guanyin hill Curve, on Baoji-Chengdu Railway in China, a double horseshoe and a buttrtfly curve, south of Weibin District, at 
 Majia Dam Curve.

Sichuan
 Chengdu–Kunming Railway 
 Naituo Curve, aishiyan Station.
 Lewu Curve.
 Handulu-lianghekou Curve.
 Liudu River Curve.
 Liugou Curve.

Xinjiang
 Neijiang–Kunming Railway 
 Yiliang Curve.
 Guiyang–Guangxi Railway 
 Layi Curve.

Yunnan
 Banmaoqing, on Nanning–Kunming Railway in China, a double horseshoe inside Yiliang County, located east of Yiliang Town, at 
 Guizhou–Kunming Railway 
 Hemaling–Beikaizhu Curve(abandoned).
 Chengdu–Kunming Railway 
 Bagele Curve.
 Fala Curve.

Gansu
 Lanzhou–Xinjiang Railway 
 Wushao Hill Curve (abandoned).

Qinghai
 Guanjiao Curve Group, Qinghai–Tibet Railway
 Erlang Curve.
 Erlang North Curve.
 Nanshan Curve.
 Luobei Curve.
 Luobei South Curve.

Iran
Also on the Trans-Iranian in the Zagros Mountains, a pair of tightly linked horseshoes forms a "figure of 8" in which one loop almost completely contains the small city of Sepiddasht, Lorestan. The other loop is almost entirely within a tunnel, with both its portals nearly side-by-side but several meters different in elevation. Both loops rotate about 250 degrees each.

Japan
 Kamaishi Line of East Japan Railway Company in Japan, has a horseshoe curve from Kamiarisu Station down to Rikuchū-Ōhashi Station ("down" on the elevation and registration of direction of the line).

Oceania

Australia
 The Cougal Spiral is a feature of the North Coast Railway in Australia that connects New South Wales with Queensland through Richmond Gap. The railway line climbs at a steady ruling gradient from Kyogle to the summit at a tunnel at the border between the two states.
 Picton railway station, New South Wales, turns back on itself at about 225 degrees.

New Zealand
 The Raurimu Spiral in New Zealand has a horseshoe curve as the first part of the climb.
 The U-bend south of Maddingly, Victoria takes a large detour to descend 100m.
 Turangarere, New Zealand North Island Main Trunk line near Hīhītahi.

References

Railway track layouts
Road transport